The Journal of Mountain Science is a monthly peer-reviewed scientific journal covering research on natural and anthropogenic environmental changes and sustainable development in mountain areas. The journal also publishes book reviews and reports on mountain research and introductions to mountain research organizations.
The journal was established in 2004, sponsored by the Chengdu Institute of Mountain Hazards and Environment, under supervision of the Chinese Academy of Sciences. It is published by Springer Science+Business Media. The editor-in-chief is Peng Cui; the executive editor-in-chief is Dunlian Qiu.

Abstracting and indexing
The Journal of Mountain Science is abstracted and indexed in:

According to the 2018 Journal Citation Reports, the journal has a 2017 impact factor of 1.135.

References
Journal of Mountain Science-Executive Editor in Chief.Retrieved 4 June 2018.

External links

Earth and atmospheric sciences journals
Publications established in 2004
Monthly journals
Springer Science+Business Media academic journals
Geophysics journals
English-language journals
Geology journals